Eric John Smith (5 August 1919 – 20 February 2017) was an award-winning Australian artist. Smith won many of Australia's major art prizes multiple times including the Archibald Prize for portraiture three times; the Wynne Prize twice; the Sulman Prize three times; and the Blake Prize for Religious Art six times.

Life and work

Eric Smith was born and raised in Brunswick, Melbourne. At the age of 17 Smith undertook the study of Commercial Art and Painting at the Brunswick Technical School and joined the Victorian Artists Society. In 1940 Smith joined the Australian Army for the remainder of the Second World War. Upon the end of the war, Smith returned to Melbourne and pursued his artistic ambitions. In 1945, a self-portrait painted on an army canvas was runner-up for the Archibald Prize. In 1956 Smith had his work shown in the Macquarie Galleries, Sydney, during the "Direction" exhibition. The success of this exhibition led to Smith's work being included in the 1963 exhibition of Australian art shown at the Tate Gallery in London. Whilst in London in 1963, Smith gained further international recognition after winning the Helena Rubenstein Art Award. In 1970 Smith won the Archibald again for his portrait of Sydney architect Neville Gruzman.

Smith's 3rd winning 1981 portraiture of the Archibald Prize caused a controversy within the art world. In 1975 John Bloomfield's winning entry was disqualified due to his portraiture of Tim Burstall being painted from a photograph. It is a condition of entry that all portraits be painted from life rather than interpretations of photographs. Bloomfield asserted that Smith's portraiture of Rudy Komon resembled a photograph taken of the subject in 1974 and hence in breach of the competition's requirements. Bloomfield threatened legal action to prevent the prize being awarded to Smith.  The controversy subsided when gallery director/art dealer Komon came to Smith's defence and said he had sat for Smith many times over the previous twenty-one years.

Awards
1944 Australia at War, War on Land Prize
1948 Catholic Centenary Art Prize
1948 CRTS Shell Company Prize
1948 CRTS Norman Bros Prize
1950 Victorian Artists’ Society, ‘60 Drawings’ Herald Prize
1953 Berrima Art Prize (Mural)
1955 Contemporary Art Society
1955 Contemporary Art Society, Madach Prize
1955 Adelaide Advertiser Prize
1956 Bathurst Art Prize
1960 Journalists’ Club Prize
1962 Royal Art Society of New South Wales Easter Show Prize
1963 Helena Rubenstein Art Award
1965 Roy H. Taffs Contemporary Art Society Award
1967 Darcy Morris Memorial Prize
1969 Royal Art Society of New South Wales, Portrait Prize
1975 Muswellbrook Art Prize

Notes

References
Eric Smith, Australian Artist

1919 births
2017 deaths
Archibald Prize winners
20th-century Australian painters
Artists from Melbourne
Australian Army personnel of World War II
Wynne Prize winners
Blake Prize for Religious Art winners
Australian portrait painters
Military personnel from Melbourne
People from Brunswick, Victoria